The Scottish Representative Peers Act 1707 (6 Ann c 78) was an act of the Parliament of Great Britain.

The whole act was repealed by sections 4 and 7(2) of, and Schedule 2 to, the Peerage Act 1963.

Title
In the title, the words from "and for the further" were repealed by section 1 of, and Schedule 1 to, the Statute Law Revision Act 1948.

See also
Representative peer

References
Halsbury's Statutes,

Great Britain Acts of Parliament 1707